Paul Yoder may refer to:

Paul P. Yoder (1897–1965), American legislator and state executive
Paul V. Yoder (1908–1990), American musician

See also
Yoder (surname)